The University of Science and Technology, Meghalaya (or simply USTM) is a private university in India  located at Ri-Bhoi, in the state of Meghalaya. It is the first State Private University in the entire Northeast India. The University is established through the University of Science and Technology, Meghalaya Act, 2008 of the Government of Meghalaya. This University is a project of Education Research & Development Foundation (ERDF), the largest educational network in the North Eastern region of India. It has been accredited with 'A' by NAAC.

History
The University of Science and Technology, Meghalaya (USTM) has been established under the provisions of University of Science and Technology, Meghalaya Act (No.6 of 2008) enacted by the Legislative Assembly of  Meghalaya and notified vide Gazette Notification No. LL(B)87/2008/21, dated 02.12.2008 of Government of Meghalaya. The University is empowered by University Grants Commission (UGC), to award degrees as specified by the UGC under section 22 of the  UGC Act, 1956.

Recognition and accreditation
USTM is recognised by UGC and approved by AICTE, and NCTE, Ministry of Human Resource Development, Government of India. USTM has also complied to UGC's 12(B) status.. The University was also recently Accredited with Grade "A" by NAAC and is amongst the first Private Universities in Northeast India to get an A Grade in its first Cycle itself.

Academics
The University is divided into following academic units:

School of Biological Sciences
 Biotechnology
 Food Science & Technology
 Botany
 Zoology
 Microbiology

School of Applied Science
 Chemistry
 Physics
 Disaster Management
 Environmental Science
 Geography
 Mathematics

School of Social Science & Humanities
 English
 Public Administration
 Political Science
 Rural Development
 Library & Information Sciences
 Sociology
 Social Work

School of Media Sciences & Cultural Studies
 Media Sciences

School of Engineering Technology
 Electronics
 Computer Application

School of Business Science
 Economics
 Commerce
 Business Administration

Prof. Qoumrul Hoque School of Education
 Education
 Psychology
 B.ED

School of Law and Research
 B.A.LLB
 LLB
 LLM

MoU & Collaboration
USTM has signed Memorandum of Understanding (MoU) with different Institutes & Universities:
 North-Eastern Space Applications Centre (NESAC), Department of Space, Govt. of India
 Universitas Ngurah Rai, Denpasar (UNR)
 Tezpur University
 National Institute of Technology, Silchar
 CSIR-NEIST
 CSIR-CRRI, New Delhi
 Bangladesh University of Health Sciences (BUHS)
 Aaranayak- A Scientific and Industrial Research Organisation
 Bamboo & Cane Development Institute (BCDI)
National Law University and Judicial Academy, Assam
 Academy of excellence Kerala (Calicut)

See also
 Education in India
 List of private universities in India
 List of universities and colleges by country
 Private University

References

External links
 USTM Official Webpage
 University of Science and Technology, Meghalaya at Twitter
 Education Research and Development Foundation Official Webpage
 "14 elders honoured with excellence awards". The Assam Tribune
 "Stress on upgrading education system".  The Assam Tribune
 "Private Universities- University Grants Commission (India)". UGC India 
 "Tezpur varsity signs MoU with USTM". The Assam Tribune
 "Jamia Millia Islamia VC promises collaboration with USTM". Two Circles.net
 "Lecture on Mission Mars in book fair". The Assam Tribune
 "Former President APJ Abdul Kalam to visit USTM on July 23". Two Circles.net

Universities in Meghalaya
2008 establishments in Meghalaya
Educational institutions established in 2008
Ri-Bhoi district
Private universities in India